The Championship consisted of 12 participants.

Final standings
 FC Karpaty Yaremcha
 FC Cementnyk Yamnytsia
 FC Delta Hvizdets
 FC Teplovyk Ivano-Frankivsk
 FC Enerhetyk-Halychyna-2 Halych
 FC Beskyd Nadvirna
 FC Tuzhyliv
 FC Kniahynyn Pidhaytsi
 FC Sokil Uhryniv
 FC Prykarpattia-2 Ivano-Frankivsk
 FC Probiy Horodenka
 FC Hazovyk Bohorodchany
 FC Hutsulschyna Kosiv
 FC Kalush
 FC Pokuttia Sniatyn
 FC Kolomyia (withdrew after couple of games)

See also
2008 Ivano-Frankivsk Oblast Second League
Ivano-Frankivsk Oblast FF

  
4
4